Alexey Yakovlevich Chervonenkis (7 September 1938 – 22 September 2014) was a Soviet and Russian mathematician. Along with Vladimir Vapnik, he was one of the main developers of the Vapnik–Chervonenkis theory, also known as the "fundamental theory of learning" - an important part of computational learning theory. Chervonenkis held joint appointments with the Russian Academy of Sciences and Royal Holloway, University of London.

Alexey Chervonenkis got lost in Losiny Ostrov National Park on 22 September 2014, and later during a search operation was found dead near Mytishchi, a suburb of Moscow. He had died of hypothermia.

References

External links
Chervonenkis' brief biography from the Computer Learning Research Centre, Royal Holloway.

1938 births
2014 deaths
20th-century Russian mathematicians
21st-century Russian mathematicians
Russian computer scientists
Soviet computer scientists
Soviet mathematicians
Russian statisticians
Deaths from hypothermia
Jewish scientists